The 2015 UCI Cyclo-cross World Championships is the World Championship for cyclo-cross for the season 2014–15. It took place in Tábor, Czech Republic on Saturday 31 January and Sunday 1 February 2015.

Medal summary

Medalists

Medal table

References

External links
 

Uci Cyclo-cross World Championships, 2015
UCI Cyclo-cross World Championships
International cycle races hosted by the Czech Republic
2015 in Czech sport
January 2015 sports events in Europe
February 2015 sports events in Europe